Nantes Atlantique may refer to:

 FC Nantes Atlantique
 Nantes Atlantique Airport